K. R. Parthasarathy may refer to:

 K. R. Parthasarathy (probabilist)
 K. R. Parthasarathy (graph theorist)